Julia Schruff was the defending champion, but chose not to participate. 
Stephanie Vogt won the title by defeating Katarzyna Piter in the final 6–2, 6–4.

Seeds

Main draw

Finals

Top half

Bottom half

References
 Main Draw
 Qualifying Draw

TEAN International - Singles
TEAN International